Helga Niessen Masthoff (née Niessen; born 11 November 1941) is a retired tennis player from West Germany. Her best Grand Slam singles tournament was when she reached the 1970 French Open final, losing to Margaret Court in straight sets.  She won the German Open three consecutive years from 1972 through 1974, beating Martina Navratilova in the 1974 final in three sets. Masthoff was the runner-up at that tournament in 1971, losing to Billie Jean King.

She won the German national singles title on ten occasions (1965, 1966, 1968, 1969, 1971, 1972, 1975, 1976, 1977 and 1978).

At the 1968 Olympic Games in Mexico City when tennis was a demonstration sport, Masthoff won the singles and doubles (with Edda Buding) gold medals and the silver medal in mixed doubles (with Jürgen Faßbender).

Masthoff teamed with Kathleen Harter to reach the women's doubles final at the 1976 French Open, losing to the team of Fiorella Bonicelli and Gail Sherriff Lovera 6–4, 1–6, 6–3. Masthoff played on West Germany's Fed Cup team from 1965 to 1967, in 1969 and 1970, and from 1972 through 1977. Her overall win–loss record was 38–18, 23–10 in singles and 15–8 in doubles.

According to Bud Collins, Masthoff was ranked in the world top 10 in 1970, 1971, and 1973, reaching a career high of World No. 6 in 1970.

In 1970 she received the Silbernes Lorbeerblatt (Silver Laurel Leaf), the highest sports award in Germany.

Grand Slam finals

Singles (1 runner-up)

Doubles (1 runner-up)

Grand Slam singles tournament timeline

Note: The Australian Open was held twice in 1977 (in January and December).

See also 
 Performance timelines for all female tennis players who reached at least one Grand Slam final

References

External links
 
 
 

1941 births
Living people
West German female tennis players
Olympic tennis players of West Germany
Tennis players at the 1968 Summer Olympics
Sportspeople from Essen
Tennis people from North Rhine-Westphalia